This is a list of Bien de Interés Cultural landmarks in the Province of Soria, Spain.

List 

 Arab arch (Ágreda)
 Bridge of Masegoso
 Church of la Virgen del Rivero
 Church of San Juan de Rabanera
 Church of San Nicolás (Soria)
 Church of San Pedro (Caracena)
 Co-Cathedral of San Pedro, Soria
 Hermitage of la Virgen del Val
 Hermitage of Nuestra Señora de Bienvenida (Monteagudo de las Vicarías)
 Hermitage of San Miguel de Gormaz
 Monastery of San Juan de Duero
 Monastery of Santa María de Huerta
 Numantia
 Palace of los Condes de Gómara
 Palace of los Ríos y Salcedo
 Puente de Masegoso
 Roman arch (Medinaceli)
 St Peter's church, Caracena
 Walls and gate of Villa de Monteagudo de las Vicarías

References 

 
Soria